The Panther Lima was a retro-styled roadster of the 1970s built by Panther Westwinds. It used Vauxhall Viva and Magnum mechanicals, including that car's 2.3 L (2279 cc) engine. The later Mark II model used a purpose-built chassis. The body was built of fibreglass in a roadster style reminiscent of an Allard or Morgan. By the standards of small scale manufacturers, the Lima was produced in volume, with over 500 built by the time of the introduction of the Lima Turbo in February 1979.

A four-speed manual was standard fitment, with an automatic transmission available as an option. The Turbo Lima was fitted with 14-inch alloy wheels, and had a TURBO graphic on the bonnet.

Production lasted from 1976 to 1982, with 897 cars produced. It was replaced by the similar Panther Kallista for the 1980s.

Sources and further reading

Lima
Retro-style automobiles
Roadsters
1980s cars
Group 4 (racing) cars
Cars introduced in 1976